Tiranchi (also Romanized as Tīrānchī; also known as Tīrūnchin) is a village in Marbin-e Olya Rural District, in the Central District of Isfahan County, Isfahan Province, Iran. At the 2006 census, its population was 2,750, in 737 families.

References 

Populated places in Khomeyni Shahr County